Augustus Molade Akiwumi  (7 April 1891 – 1985) was a barrister and judge who became the second Speaker of the Parliament of Ghana from 1958 and 1960 and an inaugural Justice of the Supreme Court of Ghana between 1960 and 1961.

Early life
Augustus Akiwumi was born in Lagos, Nigeria to a large Yoruba family of twelve children. He became a naturalised Ghanaian, after he relocated to the Gold Coast as a child with his father, S. O. Akiwumi. S. O. Akiwumi was the vice president of the Red Cross League. In 1910, Augustus Akiwumi was sent to live with guardians, a Smith family of Crosby, Cumbria in England. He attended Queen's College, Taunton, Somerset. Seven of his other siblings also attended boarding school in England. He proceeded to Fitzwilliam College, Cambridge, where he studied law. He also trained as a banker at the Midland Bank, Ludgate Hill, London, prior to his return to Ghana.

Career
He was called to the bar at the  Honourable Society of Lincoln's Inn in 1921. In 1964, while he was a High Court Judge in Ghana, he was appointed Legal Secretary in the East African Common Service Organisation. He was elected Speaker of the Parliament in February 1958 in the Dominion of Ghana. He became a judge in Ghana and was later appointed a Supreme Court Judge from July 1960 until his retirement from the bench in April 1961.

Family
Akiwumi married Grace Aryee and, subsequently, Helen Kabuki Ocansey, both Ghanaians.

See also
 List of judges of the Supreme Court of Ghana
 Supreme Court of Ghana

Notes

External links
Picture on cover of "Life" magazine of January 18, 1960

1891 births
Alumni of Fitzwilliam College, Cambridge
Convention People's Party (Ghana) politicians
Ghanaian Christian Scientists
Ghanaian Freemasons
20th-century Ghanaian judges
Speakers of the Parliament of Ghana
Members of Lincoln's Inn
People educated at Queen's College, Taunton
People from Lagos
Nigerian emigrants to Ghana
Naturalized citizens of Ghana
Justices of the Supreme Court of Ghana
Year of death missing
Yoruba legal professionals
Yoruba bankers
Residents of Lagos